Jason Quenneville (born February 23, 1982), professionally known as DaHeala, is a Canadian record producer and songwriter managed by SAL&CO. He has produced for artists such as the Weeknd, Halsey, Lil Uzi Vert, and Belly, among others. He was nominated for three Grammy Awards for his production work on the Weeknd's 2015 album, Beauty Behind the Madness. Over the course of his career, he has collaborated with producers like Max Martin, Daft Punk, Rick Rubin, and Metro Boomin.

Early life and career
Quenneville grew up in Gatineau, Quebec in a household that spoke both French and English. At the age of 13, he learned how to DJ at a youth center which led to him learning how to use FL Studio 3 (formerly FruityLoops). His first production work was at the age of 23, when he worked on a mixtape (Death Before Dishonor) for Belly. He continued working with Belly on later projects including the 2007 album, The Revolution. He also produced all the tracks on Massari's 2005 self-titled debut album.

Quenneville began working with the Weeknd on the singer's 2013 album, Kiss Land. He produced every song on the album in collaboration with DannyBoyStyles and the Weeknd himself. In 2014, he earned a production placement on Rick Ross' album, Mastermind, for the track "In Vein" featuring the Weeknd. He collaborated with fellow producers, Metro Boomin and Rick Rubin, on the song.

In 2015, Quenneville was the executive producer on the Weeknd's album, Beauty Behind the Madness. He also produced and wrote several tracks on the album including "Often", "Acquainted", "Dark Times" (featuring Ed Sheeran), and "Earned It". The last song, alternatively titled "Earned It (Fifty Shades of Grey)", appeared on the soundtrack to the 2015 film, Fifty Shades of Grey. It was nominated for the Academy Award for Best Original Song and two Grammy Awards for Best R&B Song and Best Song Written for Visual Media. The nominations were shared among Quenneville, the Weeknd, Belly, and Stephan Moccio. The album itself was nominated for the Grammy Award for Album of the Year and won the award for Best Urban Contemporary Album.

In 2016, Quenneville co-wrote five tracks on the Weeknd's third studio album, Starboy, including the title track which featured Daft Punk. For co-writing the song, Quenneville earned a SOCAN No. 1 Song Award. Also in 2016, he co-wrote the Halsey track, "Not Afraid Anymore", which appeared on the soundtrack to the sequel film, Fifty Shades Darker. Over the course of the next two years, Quenneville produced and wrote tracks for several other artists including Lil Uzi Vert ("UnFazed" featuring the Weeknd), French Montana ("A Lie" featuring the Weeknd), and Nav ("What I Need").

In 2020, Quenneville co-wrote and produced tracks on the Weeknd's fourth studio album, After Hours, including the 2019 single, "Blinding Lights", which eventually became the Billlboard #1 Greatest Hot 100 Hit of All Time in 2021. In late March 2020, the Weeknd released three bonus tracks on the album, all of which were produced by DaHeala.

Discography

Nominations and awards

References

External links
DaHeala on Twitter

1982 births
Canadian record producers
Black Canadian musicians
Canadian songwriters
Living people
Musicians from Gatineau
Juno Award for Songwriter of the Year winners